Dylan Stadelmann (born 30 January 1989) is a retired Swiss professional footballer.

Career
Dylan was born in Delémont, Switzerland, on 30 January 1989. He grew up with his brothers and parents in Moutier and played with the Jura Team until age 13. At this time, he joined the Lausanne-Sport training centre. He played there and joined the 1st team (currently in Super League, 1st division) at age 18. He played in the Europa League 2010–2011 and the Swiss cup final in 2010 against FC Basel. He also played with FC Malley, FC Stade-Nyonnais and Wohlen from June 2013 to December 2015 before joining FC Wil in January 2016.

Stadelmann retired in March 2018.

References

External links

1989 births
Living people
Swiss men's footballers
Swiss Challenge League players
FC Lausanne-Sport players
Yverdon-Sport FC players
FC Stade Nyonnais players
FC Wohlen players
FC Wil players
Association football midfielders
People from Delémont
Sportspeople from the canton of Jura